Rashmi Uday Singh is an Indian food expert  TV host and author.

Career
As a food expert she focuses on vegetarianism and health. She has authored more than 40 books. She has won Gourmand World Cookbook award and Chevalier dans l'Ordre des Arts et des Lettres from the government of France.

She was India's first ever city-restaurant guide and the world's first vegetarian guide to Paris. Also in the list of firsts is Rashmi's Nightlife guide to Mumbai followed by a city restaurant guide to Pune. India's first ever complete TV show "Health Today" was produced, scripted, directed and presented by her. Rashmi Uday Singh's Good food Academy and Sunshine workshops were trail blazing too.

Television 
On national Television, Singh has produced, scripted, directed and hosted 52 episodes of "Health Today" on DD Metro. Her Food TV shows (hosted and filmed in India and internationally) include "Foodie Fundas with Rashmi" (Headlines Today) "Delicious Discoveries with Rashmi" (ET Now) and "The Foodie" (Times Now). Singh also did political and financial reporting for "Aaj tak" “Business Baatein" and "Newstrack".

Media articles

On food and health 
Singh continues to write her weekly food column in Bombay Times as well as regular columns in Chennai Times, Mid-day, Dainik Jagran, The BBC Goodfood India and in several national and international publications. She wrote "Health Online", her popular weekly column in The Indian Express for fifteen years and Foodline in "The Hindu" for seven years.

Vegetarianism 
Singh has been systematically and single-handedly researching vegetarian food and vegetarian restaurants around the globe; China, Japan, Russia, France, and many more countries. After three decades, Singh has unrivaled knowledge and information on vegetarian food and restaurants.

She has been systematically tracking this trend in her columns and articles. Trailblazing with The world's first vegetarian guide to Paris, The vegetarian cookbook – "Around the world in 80 Plates" and now followed up with her thesis for Higher studies in gastronomy in Paris on "The rise and the rise of vegetarianism’

Education, IRS, awards and jury 
Having studied English literature hons, graduated in Law, studied journalism and a master's in management, Singh wrote the IAS exam and having worked 15 years in the Indian Revenue Service, she resigned as Commissioner of tax to follow her passion in Television and newsprint. Recipient of several Gourmand World cookbook awards, she was conferred with the knighthood of the Chevalier of the arts and letters by the French government and also won several other awards. Singh is on the jury of several international and national academies. The Worlds 50 Best, Worlds best female chef, Times she unltd to name a few.

Books
Around the World in 80 plates: The Gourmet's Guide to Vegetarian Cuisine 
A Vegetarian in Paris
A Vegetarian in Paris
Paris, the world's gourmet capital, a dream for omnivores – and a nightmare for vegetarians. Or is it? In this path-breaking book, one of India's most intrepid foodies, Rashmi Uday Singh, shoots all the clichés, eats her way through Paris and nails a vegetarian side to it that's as dazzling as it is delicious. From cheap and cheerful to French gastronomique – multiple surprises show up in over 500 multi-cuisine restaurants, food shops, cooking classes, bakeries, chocolatiers and more. Including fabulous vegan restaurants, a vegan bed-and-breakfast, vegan tours and the world's first vegetarian guide to the discerning herbivore, the book is also a wonderful complement to those who enjoy their meat with a plate of potatoesTimes Food Guide - Mumbai Mumbai by NightHeinz Good Food Guide 2003Lifegiver: the biography of the legendary obstetrician and gynaecologistThe Metro plus Food guide Midday Good food Guide 1997 The Oberoi-Penguin Celebrity CookbookThe Midday Good food Guide to Mumbai, 2000The Midday Good food Guide to Pune, 2000 - 2001Rashmi Uday Singh's Chicken CookbookThe Penguin celebrity cookbookTimes Food & Nightlife Guide Mumbai 2013Times Food & Nightlife Guide Mumbai 2014Times Food & Nightlife Guide Mumbai 2015Times Food & Nightlife Guide Mumbai 2016Times Food & Nightlife Guide Mumbai 2017Times Food & Nightlife Guide Mumbai 2018''

Awards
Chevalier dans l’Ordre des Arts et des Lettres (Knight of the Ordre des Arts et des Lettres).
Gourmand World Cookbook Awards Around the world in 80 plates (1995)
Gourmand World Cookbook Awards Times Food Guide (2008–2009)
Gourmand World Cookbook Awards Times Food Guide (2010–2011)
SINGAPORE EXPERIENCE AWARDS Singapore Surprise (2009)
ATOUT FRANCE Best Media Personality Award
GR8 WOMENS ACHIEVER'S AWARD 2011
INCOME TAX AWARD FOR THE HIGHEST TAX COLLECTION 1982/83

References

Writers from Mumbai
Women writers from Maharashtra
Living people
Chevaliers of the Ordre des Arts et des Lettres
1955 births
Indian food writers